Javanese dictionaries involve the Indonesian language Javanese.  This is a select list.

1835 
1835  - Dutch and Javanese

1870 

1870  - Javanese and France

1875 

1874  - 2nd edition, of 1845 book  - Dutch and Javanese

1911 

1911

See also 

 Indonesian language

Javanese language

Dictionaries by language